Mamintal Abdul Jabbar Tamano (December 25, 1928 – May 18, 1994) was a Filipino statesman and a former Senator of the Philippines.

Early life and education
Tamano was born in Tamparan, Lanao. He graduated valedictorian at the Lanao High School in 1947. He obtained a Bachelor of Arts degree in 1952 and a Bachelor of Laws degree the following year, both from the University of the Philippines. He was a member of the Upsilon Sigma Phi fraternity. He also obtained a Master of Laws at the Cornell University in 1958.

Career and political life
In 1954, he was appointed as justice of the peace of Marantao, Lanao. In 1959, he became a provincial secretary. That same year, he was elected as vice-governor of the newly formed province of Lanao del Sur, serving until 1969.

He was elected as Senator in 1969 but he was unable to finish his term because President Ferdinand Marcos declared martial law. During the martial law years, he went on self-exile to Saudi Arabia staying there until 1986, when Marcos was ousted by the People Power Revolution. Shortly afterwards, he became a member of President Corazon Aquino's cabinet as Deputy Minister of Foreign Relations.

In 1987, he was elected again to the Senate. As a Senator, he worked for the autonomy for the Muslims and the rest of Mindanao and on Mindanao's natural resources to upgrade the conditions of that islands. He was the principal author of Republic Act 6848, which provided for the 
charter of the Al-Amanah Islamic Investment Bank of the Philippines.

In the 1992 elections, he sought reelection as senator under the Laban ng Demokratikong Pilipino ticket, but lost.

Personal life
Senator Tamano was married to Haji Putri Zorayda Abbas with whom he had nine children, including Atty. Adel Tamano former president of Pamantasan ng Lungsod ng Maynila and current chief administrative officer of Dito Telecommunity, who unsuccessfully sought election to the Philippine Senate in 2010.

Death
He died of cerebral hemorrhage on May 18, 1994.

References

External links
 Former Senators – Mamintal Tamano
 National Historical Commission of the Philippines

Nacionalista Party politicians
Senators of the 8th Congress of the Philippines
Senators of the 7th Congress of the Philippines
1928 births
1994 deaths
University of the Philippines alumni
Cornell University alumni
Recipients of Gawad Mabini
20th-century Filipino judges
Filipino Muslims
Laban ng Demokratikong Pilipino politicians
People from Lanao del Sur
Corazon Aquino administration personnel